Olaf Dahll (19 December 1889 – 27 May 1968) was a Norwegian lawyer, competitive rower and sports administrator.

Working career
Dahll was born in Kristiania, and graduated with the cand.jur. degree in 1913. After various assignments, including for the Ministry of Foreign Affairs, he started his own practice as barrister in Kristiania from 1921, eventually with access to work with Supreme Court cases.

Sporting career
Dahll participated in coxed four at the 1912 Summer Olympics in Stockholm. He chaired Norske Studenters Roklub 1915–1916, and was president of the Norwegian Fencing Federation from 1929 to 1934.

References

External links

1889 births
1968 deaths
20th-century Norwegian lawyers
Rowers from Oslo
Norwegian male rowers
Rowers at the 1912 Summer Olympics
Olympic rowers of Norway